Fencing started in India with the foundation of the Fencing Association of India in 1974. It was recognized by the Indian Government in 1997. It is affiliated with the Indian Olympic Association, Asian Fencing Confederation, Commonwealth Fencing Federation and Fédération Internationale d'Escrime (FIE).

The association has been holding national competitions in Sub-Junior (1999), Cadet (2004), Junior (1992) and Senior (1986) categories, both for boys/men and girls/women.

In Feb 2016, The Indian contingent at the Asian Junior and Cadet Fencing Championship in Damam, Saudi Arabia won two silver and three bronze medals. In the individual events, 17-year-old Karan Singh clinched bronze in the Junior Boys Sabre event while SN Siva Magesh, 14, won silver in the Cadet Boys Épée event. This is the first time that India has won a medal in the Junior (Under 20) category.

In May 2017, India's C. A. Bhavani Devi won the gold medal in the sabre event of the Turnoi Satellite Fencing Championship held at Reykjavik in Iceland and became the first Indian to win a gold medal in an international fencing event. Shilpa Garg(patiala) had previously won a silver medal in a satellite event.

References